Sixto Rojas (28 June 1982, in Capiatá, Paraguay – 10 January 2007, in Asunción, Paraguay) was a Paraguayan footballer who played for clubs in Paraguay and Chile.

Career
Rojas played as an attacking midfielder for the reserve side of Club Olimpia, and made appearances for the Paraguay national under-23 football team, before joining Olimpia's first team. He made his Paraguayan Primera División debut for Olimpia against Club Sol de América on 10 April 2004. He made 26 appearances for Olimpia from April 2004 to May 2005.

Rojas left Olimpia in 2005, moving to Chile to play for Club de Deportes Concepción. One year later he returned to Paraguay where he joined Club 12 de Octubre. He scored four goals in 31 games with 12 de Octubre during 2006.

Rojas had recently signed for newly promoted Primera División club Sportivo Trinidense when he died during preseason training in 2007.

Teams
  Olimpia 2004–2005
  Club de Deportes Concepción 2005
  12 de Octubre 2006
  Sportivo Trinidense 2007

References

External links
 Profile at BDFA
 Article about Rojas' death

1982 births
2007 deaths
People from Capiatá
Paraguayan footballers
Paraguayan expatriate footballers
Sportivo Trinidense footballers
12 de Octubre Football Club players
Club Olimpia footballers
Deportes Concepción (Chile) footballers
Expatriate footballers in Chile
Association football midfielders